This page is an overview of the list of protected heritage sites in Hainaut (province), alphabetically ordered by town name. This list is part of the protected heritage sites of Belgium.

List of protected heritage sites, in Aiseau-Presles
List of protected heritage sites, in Anderlues
List of protected heritage sites, in Antoing
List of protected heritage sites, in Ath
List of protected heritage sites, in Beaumont, Belgium
List of protected heritage sites, in Belœil
List of protected heritage sites, in Bernissart
List of protected heritage sites, in Binche
List of protected heritage sites, in Boussu
List of protected heritage sites, in Braine-le-Comte
List of protected heritage sites, in Brugelette
List of protected heritage sites, in Brunehaut
List of protected heritage sites, in Celles, Hainaut
List of protected heritage sites, in Chapelle-lez-Herlaimont
List of protected heritage sites, in Charleroi
List of protected heritage sites, in Châtelet, Belgium
List of protected heritage sites, in Chièvres
List of protected heritage sites, in Chimay
List of protected heritage sites, in Colfontaine
List of protected heritage sites, in Comines-Warneton
List of protected heritage sites, in Courcelles, Belgium
List of protected heritage sites, in Dour
List of protected heritage sites, in Écaussinnes
List of protected heritage sites, in Ellezelles
List of protected heritage sites, in Enghien
List of protected heritage sites, in Erquelinnes
List of protected heritage sites, in Estaimpuis
List of protected heritage sites, in Estinnes
List of protected heritage sites, in Farciennes
List of protected heritage sites, in Fleurus
List of protected heritage sites, in Flobecq
List of protected heritage sites, in Fontaine-l'Evêque
List of protected heritage sites, in Frameries
List of protected heritage sites, in Frasnes-lez-Anvaing

List of protected heritage sites, in Froidchapelle
List of protected heritage sites, in Gerpinnes
List of protected heritage sites, in Ham-sur-Heure-Nalinnes
List of protected heritage sites, in Hensies
List of protected heritage sites, in Honnelles
List of protected heritage sites, in Jurbise
List of protected heritage sites, in La Louvière
List of protected heritage sites, in Le Rœulx
List of protected heritage sites, in Lens, Belgium
List of protected heritage sites, in Les Bons Villers
List of protected heritage sites, in Lessines
List of protected heritage sites, in Leuze-en-Hainaut
List of protected heritage sites, in Lobbes
List of protected heritage sites, in Manage
List of protected heritage sites, in Merbes-le-Château
List of protected heritage sites, in Momignies
List of protected heritage sites, in Mons
List of protected heritage sites, in Mont-de-l'Enclus
List of protected heritage sites, in Montigny-le-Tilleul
List of protected heritage sites, in Morlanwelz
List of protected heritage sites, in Mouscron
List of protected heritage sites, in Pecq, Belgium
List of protected heritage sites, in Péruwelz
List of protected heritage sites, in Pont-à-Celles
List of protected heritage sites, in Quaregnon
List of protected heritage sites, in Quévy
List of protected heritage sites, in Quiévrain
List of protected heritage sites, in Rumes
List of protected heritage sites, in Saint-Ghislain
List of protected heritage sites, in Seneffe
List of protected heritage sites, in Silly, Belgium
List of protected heritage sites, in Sivry-Rance
List of protected heritage sites, in Soignies
List of protected heritage sites, in Thuin
List of protected heritage sites, in Tournai

 
 *Hainaut